Lavaré is a commune in the Sarthe department in the region of Pays de la Loire in north-western France.

Twin towns – sister cities

  Old Catton , England. Twinning association 
  Wagenfeld , Germany

See also
Communes of the Sarthe department

References

Communes of Sarthe